The 2009 Giro della Toscana Int. Femminile – Memorial Michela Fanini was the 16th edition of the Giro della Toscana Int. Femminile – Memorial Michela Fanini, a women's cycling stage race in Italy. It was rated by the UCI as a category 2.1 race and was held between 15 and 20 September 2009.

Stages

Stage 1
15 September 2009 – Viareggio to Viareggio, Team time trial

Stage 2
16 September 2009 – Porcari to Altopascio,

Stage 3
17 September 2009 – Lari to Volterra,

Stage 4
18 September 2009 – Campi Bisenzio to Campi Bisenzio,

Stage 5
19 September 2009 – Segromigno in Piano to Capannor,

Stage 6
20 September 2009 – Quarrata to Firenze,

Final classification

Source

See also
 2009 in women's road cycling

References

External links
 

2009 in women's road cycling
Giro della Toscana Int. Femminile – Memorial Michela Fanini
2009 in Italian sport